Nate Bauers (born March 11, 1982 in Oakton, Virginia) was a professional lacrosse player with the Washington Bayhawks of Major League Lacrosse and Finland Lacrosse in The European Championships of Lacrosse.

Professional career
Bauers earned a spot on the 2007 Washington Bayhawks roster after participating in the team’s preseason tryouts.  Bauers earned a Defensive Player of the Week honor during the 2007 season after holding MLL All-Star attackman Scott Urick to one goal in a Bayhawks victory over the New Jersey Pride.  Bauers played for the Manchester Waconians of the English Lacrosse Association during the 2004-2005 season.

College career
Bauer attended Fairfield University where he was an All-GWLL Second Team selection in 2003 and 2004.  In 2002, Bauers helped the Stags win the Great Western Lacrosse League Championship and earn the program's first birth in the NCAA Men's Lacrosse Championship tournament.  In 2004, Bauer served as team captain for the Stags and was selected to play in the United States Intercollegiate Lacrosse Association (USILA) North/South Classic and in the New England Intercollegiate Lacrosse Association (NEILA) East/West Senior All Star game.

References

External links
Washington Bayhawks Profile
Washington Bayhawks Player Spotlight

Major League Lacrosse players
Living people
1982 births
Fairfield Stags men's lacrosse players
American lacrosse players
People from Oakton, Virginia